The 1918 Wabash Little Giants football team represented Wabash College during the 1918 college football season.

Schedule

References

Wabash
Wabash Little Giants football seasons
Wabash Little Giants football